Juncus lesueurii is a species of rush known by the common names Lesueur's rush and salt rush. It is accepted by some authorities as Juncus lescurii.

Distribution
It is native to the western coast of North America from British Columbia to California, where it grows in freshwater and salt marshes, and near sand dunes.

Deacription
It is a rhizomatous perennial herb forming clumps of stems often well exceeding one meter in height. The inflorescence is a cluster of several greenish or brownish flowers accompanied by one cylindrical bract which looks like an extension of the stem.

References

External links
Juncus lesueurii. NatureServe Explorer Version 7.1.
Juncus lescurii. CalPhotos.

lesueurii
Plants described in 1863
Flora of the West Coast of the United States
Flora of British Columbia